The Blue Dragon Series Awards is an annual awards ceremony that is organised by Sports Chosun (a sister brand of the Chosun Ilbo) for excellence in streaming television and OTT in South Korea.

The Blue Dragon Series Awards considers only original dramas and variety shows produced and invested in by streaming services offered in Korea, including Netflix, Disney+, seezn, Apple TV+, WATCHA, wavve, Kakao TV, Coupang Play, and TVING.

History 
It was created in 2022 by Sports Chosun newspaper.

The 1st Blue Dragon Series Awards ceremony was held on July 19, 2022 at Incheon Paradise Hotel. In this edition, 13 categories were awarded. The nominations for 13 categories were announced for the Korean OTT's series.

Categories
 Best Drama
 Best Entertainment Program
 Best Actor
 Best Actress
 Best Male Entertainer
 Best Female Entertainer
 Best Supporting Actor
 Best Supporting Actress
 Best New Actor
 Best New Actress
 Best New Male Entertainer
 Best New Female Entertainer
 Popular Star Award

Awards

References

External links 
  

South Korean television awards
Awards established in 2022
Annual events in South Korea